Cape Boothby is a rounded cape in East Antarctica along the east side of the coastal projection of Edward VIII Plateau.

Further reading 
 Defense Mapping Agency  1992, Sailing Directions (planning Guide) and (enroute) for Antarctica, P 421

External links 

 Cape Boothby on USGS website
 Cape Boothby on AADC website
 Cape Boothby on SCAR website

References 
 

Headlands of Mac. Robertson Land